The Southern California World Water Forum—SoCal WWF promotes regional water-use efficiency and conservation in addition to sustainable potable water and sanitation projects for developing world communities. The Forum is an educational and small grants program designed to provide information, and to reward innovative projects and proposals from colleges and universities in Southern California.

Purpose
Synopsis from the U.S. Department of Interior, United States Bureau of Reclamation:
"The purpose of the Southern California World Water Forum program is to underscore the importance of water quality and conservation issues. The Metropolitan Water District of Southern California—MWD, along with other partners, will establish a grant competition for community colleges and universities. Grants will be offered for research and development on the implementation of water-use efficient concepts or technology that can be cost-effectively implemented in water-stressed regions, locally or internationally."

Partners
The Southern California World Water Forum is a unique partnership of major utility companies, government agencies, and NGOs (non-governmental organizations). Principal partners are the United States Bureau of Reclamation, Metropolitan Water District of Southern California, Los Angeles County Sanitation, and Friends of the United Nations. Other sponsoring NGO participants have included American Society of Civil Engineers, U.S. Water and Power, and Water For People.

College and University Participation
Over 40 different colleges, community colleges, and universities have participated, with many receiving grants of $10,000 to develop innovative water and sanitation projects. SoCal WWF participants include: 
University of California campuses: UCLA, UC Irvine, UC Riverside, and UC San Diego.
University of Southern California
Loyola Marymount University
California State Universities: in CSU Long Beach, CSU Los Angeles, Cal Poly Pomona, CSU San Diego, and CSU San Bernardino.
Santa Monica College
Art Center College of Design

See also
Index—Water conservation
Index—Water development and sustainability
Index—Water and the environment

References

External links
Southern California World Water Forum—SoCal WWF website

SoCal WWF grants and projects links
U.S. Bureau of Reclamation: WCFSP grants
Metropolitan Water District - SoCal WWF
Grants.gov
U.S. water and power
Labs of CWEA: SoCal WWF
Santa Monica College
UC Riverside: design
Businesswire.com
Art Center College of Design - SoCal WWF Grants

Nature conservation organizations based in the United States
Sustainability organizations
Water conservation
Water resource management in the United States
Education in California
Charities based in California
Organizations based in Los Angeles County, California
Environment of Greater Los Angeles
Environmental issues in California
Grants (money)
Environmental organizations based in Los Angeles